Telmatobius chusmisensis is a species of frogs in the family Telmatobiidae. It is endemic to northern Chile and is only known from a number of localities in the Tarapacá Region. The specific name chusmisensis refers to its type locality, Chusmisa.

Description
Males measure  and females  in snout–vent length. Head is slightly narrower than body. Forelimbs are moderaterely robust; hind limbs are long and have webbed toes. Ground colour of dorsum is light brown or greenish brown, profusely spotted with minute, black spots. Belly is white or light yellow. Ventral surfaces of thighs are light brown. There are irregular apricot-coloured spots on dorsum and ventral surfaces of thighs. Dorsal surface, flanks, and limbs are covered with small, spiculate granules.

One tadpole was near metamorphosis (Gosner stage 42) and measured  in snout–vent length.

Habitat
At the type locality, T. chusmisensis were collected from a small, slow-moving stream in a semi-desert area. Adults were encountered below stones and tadpoles below aquatic plants along the banks of the stream. As a species found in a generally arid area and confined to aquatic habitats, its distribution is naturally fragmented. Extraction of surface water is a threat to this species. It is not known from any protected areas.

References

chusmisensis
Endemic fauna of Chile
Amphibians of Chile
Amphibians of the Andes
Amphibians described in 2006